State Highway 54 (SH 54) is a State Highway in Kerala, India that starts in Kozhikode and ends in Kalpetta. The highway is 99.0 km long.

The Route Map 
Kozhikode - Pavangad – Ulliyeri – Perambra – Kadiyagad - Peruvannamuzhi - Chempanoda -  Poozhithode - Kariganny– Padinjarethara – Kalpetta

Note that the section Padinjarethara to Poozhithode is not yet laid as the environmental clearance to build the road through the forest is pending.

See also 
Roads in Kerala
List of State Highways in Kerala

References 

State Highways in Kerala
Roads in Kozhikode district
Roads in Wayanad district